Election to the 5th convocation of the Moscow City Duma was held October 11 of that year to the Moscow City Duma. On party lists were elected 18 of the 35 deputies, 17 deputies were in single-member constituencies. To get into the City Duma parties need to overcome the 7% threshold. The term of office of the new City Duma is five years. It had been four years.

Background 
On July 8, 2009, the Moscow City Duma elections were announced for October 11. 4 August 2009 issued Decree of the Government of Moscow on the organizational and logistical election to lead this work was entrusted to the Deputy Mayor of Moscow Valery Vinogradov Jurevichu.

These parties participated in the elections: United Russia, the Communist Party, Just Russia, Yabloko, the Liberal Democratic Party, the Right Cause, the Patriots of Russia, Solidarity.

On July 14 a conference of the Moscow city branch of the Communist Party put forward a candidate. On the same day his first three named in the Liberal Democratic Party, but the pre-election conference appointed only on August 3. July 27 put forward their list of Patriots of Russia.

"Yabloko" and "just cause" were negotiating on nominating a single list. Was initiated by the co-chair of the "right things" Boris Titov, who is ready for the election period to withdraw from his party to head the election list of the "Apple". In this case, two other co-chairman Leonid Gozman and Georgy Bovt called for independent participation of the party in the elections. July 22 Yabloko put forward their list, and the "just cause" refused to participate in the elections, but the head of the Moscow branch Igor Trunov July 26 announced that he would run as a self-promoter, one of the single-member districts. [8] Documents filed for registration as a federal political council of the "right things" Boris Nadezhdin, as well as members of the council of the Moscow organization Elena Guseva and Sirazhdinov Ramazanov.

August 4, 2009 the city hosted the conference of the regional branch of the party "United Russia". [9] The Conference approved the list of deputies to the Moscow elections earlier, on July 29, approved by the Presidium of the General Council of the party. [10] According to the observations of correspondents of the magazine "Kommersant-Vlast" to the end July election headquarters of the ruling party did not start any real election campaign. The publication delay is tied to the internal struggle within the party between the federal and Mountain guide.

The latter, August 5, the party conference held at the "Fair Russia". A few days before it was declared head the list for city elections.

Attempt to expose your organization has made a list of the Russian National Union, but her list was not even considered, because the organization does not have the right to participate in elections.

August 23 "Yabloko" and "Patriots of Russia" claimed that collected the required number of signatures to check their lists
Color shows the percentage of votes for a particular party in every district of the capital:

References 

Legislative elections in Moscow
2009 elections in Russia
2009 in Moscow